= Jaipur Elevated Road =

Road in Jaipur, India

Jaipur Elevated Skyway

Route information
- Length: 4.5 km (2.8 mi)

Major junctions
- From: Gopal Wadi Bus Stand
- To: Vidhyut Nagar

Location
- Country: India
- States: Rajasthan
- Major cities: Jaipur

Highway system
- Roads in India; Expressways; National; State; Asian

Acharya Tulsi setu also known as Jaipur elevated road is an elevated road in the city of Jaipur, in the state of Rajasthan in India.
